The Central Aerohydrodynamic Institute (also (Zhukovsky) Central Institute of Aerodynamics, TsAGI) was founded in Moscow by Russian aviation pioneer Nikolai Yegorovich Zhukovsky on December 1, 1918.

History
From 1925 and up to the 1930s, TsAGI developed and hosted Tupolev's AGOS (Aviatziya, Gidroaviatziya i Opytnoye Stroitelstvo, the "Aviation, Hydroaviation, and Experimental Construction"), the first aircraft design bureau in Soviet Union, and at the time the main one. In 1930, two other major aircraft design bureaus in the country were the Ilyushin's TsKB (Tsentralnoye Konstruksionnoye Byuro means "Central Design Bureau") and an independent, short-lived Kalinin's team in Kharkiv.

In 1935 TsAGI was partly relocated to the former dacha settlement Otdykh (literally, "Relaxation") converted to the new urban-type settlement Stakhanovo. It was named after Alexey Stakhanov, a famous Soviet miner. On April 23, 1947, the settlement was granted town status and renamed to Zhukovsky. The Moscow branch of the institute is known Moscow complex of TsAGI.

In 1965 in Zhukovsky a Department of Aeromechanics and Flight Engineering of MIPT was established with support of TsAGI's research and knowledge base to educate young specialists for aerospace industry.

Among TsAGI's developments are the participation in the rocket Energia and the Space Shuttle Buran projects.

Heads of the institute 
 1918–1921: N. Y. Zhukovsky
 1921–1931: S. A. Chaplygin
 1932–1937: N. M. Kharlamov
 1938–1939: M. N. Shulzhenko
 1940–1941: 
 1941–1950: S. N. Shishkin
 1950–1960: A. I. Makarevsky
 1960–1967: V. M. Myasishchev
 1967–1989: 
 1989–1995: G I. Zagaynov
 1995–1998: V. Ja. Neuland
 1998–2006: V. G. Dmitriyev
 2006–2007: V. A. Kargopoltsev
 2007–2009: 
 2009–2015: B. S. Aljoshin
 2015–2018: S. L. Chernyshev
 August 2018–present: K. I. Sypalo

Famous scientist (partial list) 
See also :Category:Central Aerohydrodynamic Institute employees
 Sergey Chaplygin
 Anatoly Dorodnitsyn
 Mstislav Keldysh
 Sergei Korolev
 Sergey Khristianovich
 Yuri Ryzhov
 Leonid Shkadov
 Max Taitz
 Vladimir Vetchinkin

References

External links 
 Historical video to celebrate first 100 years of TsAGI 
TsAGI in the Buran programme
TsAGI on Google Maps

Research institutes in Russia
Research institutes in the Soviet Union
Aviation in the Soviet Union
Aerospace research institutes
Aviation research institutes
Federal State Unitary Enterprises of Russia
Companies based in Moscow Oblast